Charlie Castaneda (born 1970 San Diego, California) and Brody Reiman (born 1970 Bethlehem, Pennsylvania) are two contemporary artists who work together to form castaneda/reiman.

Biographies
The artists met each other while in college at Carnegie Mellon University in Pittsburgh, Pennsylvania, where they earned their BFAs in 1992. They went on to the University of California at Davis in Davis, California to earn their MFAs in 1994. Since then their work has been included in international group exhibitions in the Gallery for Contemporary Art in Tel Aviv, Israel (1999) and in the Seoul Museum of Art in Seoul, Korea (2003). The artists are represented by DCKT Contemporary in New York City, where they have had four solo exhibitions. They have also had solo exhibitions at the Stephen Wirtz Gallery (San Francisco, California), Sandroni Rey (Venice, California), and several other galleries.

Solo exhibitions
2010 
 Oakscapes and land objects, Stephen Wirtz Gallery, San Francisco, California 
 DCKT Contemporary, San Francisco Fine Art Fair, San Francisco, California 

2009 
 Sculptures of places we’ve never been, DCKT Contemporary, New York, New York 
 Places we have never been, Stephen Wirtz Gallery, San Francisco, California 

2008 
 Untitled (Sketch for a Landscape), DCKT Contemporary, Pulse Contemporary Art Fair, New York, New York 

2006 
 DCKT Contemporary, New York, New York 

2003 
 Floorplan landscape, DCKT Contemporary, New York, New York 
 Floorplan/ New Work, Stephen Wirtz Gallery, San Francisco, California 

1999 
 Sandroni Rey, Venice, California 

1998 
 Thomas Healy Gallery, New York, New York 
 Four Walls Art Space, San Francisco, California 
 John Berggruen Gallery, San Francisco, California 

1994 
 From Here to There. Onions Included., Southern Exposure, San Francisco, California 
 Master Visions of Monochromatic Fields, Basement Gallery, Davis, California

Selected group exhibitions
2011 
 Beneath The Picture, Bear Ridgeway Exhibitions at Ambach & Rice, Seattle, Washington 

2010 
 2010 Art Practice Faculty Show, Worth Ryder Gallery, Berkeley, California 
 It's My World, Baer Ridgway Exhibitions, San Francisco, California 

2008 
 Make the Art You Need: The UC Berkeley Department of Art Faculty Show, Worth Ryder Gallery, University of California, Berkeley, California 
 Summer ’08, Stephen Wirtz Gallery, San Francisco, California 

2007–08 
 Artists of Invention: A Century of CCA, Oakland Museum of California, Oakland, California 

2007 
 CCA Centennial, Stephen Wirtz Gallery, San Francisco, California 

2005 
 Eureka, Berkeley Art Museum, Berkeley, California 
 Welcome 2 the Jungle, DCKT Contemporary, New York, New York 

2003 
 Pleasure Factory, Seoul Museum of Art, Seoul, South Korea 
 101 California Street, San Francisco, California 

2002 
 House Broken, Rena Bransten Gallery, San Francisco, California 
 Manifest Destiny and the Contemporary American Landscape, Sun Valley Center for the Arts, Sun Valley, Idaho 

2001 
 Sandroni Rey, Venice, California 
 In Through the Outdoors, Traywick Gallery, Berkeley, California 

2000 
 Pierogi 2000 Flatfiles, Yerba Buena Center for the Arts, San Francisco, California 
 It Can Change, Oakland, California 

1999–2000
 Bay Area Now 2, Yerba Buena Center for the Arts, San Francisco, California 

1999 
 Charles Cowles Gallery, New York, New York 
 Continuing California, San Francisco Museum of Modern Art, San Francisco, California 
 Gallery for Contemporary Art, Tel Aviv, Israel 
 Three Day Weekend, California College of Arts and Crafts, San Francisco, California 
 Structural Elements, Transamerica Building, San Francisco, California 
 Material Perception, TrizecHahn Gallery, Charlotte, North Carolina 

1998 
 SAP, Lanai Hotel, San Francisco, California 

1997 
 Structures: Buildings in American Art, John Berggruen Gallery, San Francisco, California 
 The Bay Area Awards Show, New Langton Arts, San Francisco, California 
 Stirred not Shaken, Refusalon, San Francisco, California 
 Show Five, Gallery Oboy, San Francisco, California 

1996 
 Gleen, Four Walls Art Space, San Francisco, California 
 Four Walls Art Space, San Francisco, California 

1995 
 Obsessions, Southern Exposure, San Francisco, California 
 Melrose at Montavlo, Villa Montavlo Estate for the Arts, Saratoga, California 

1994 
 Turning the Camera on Themselves, pARTS Alternative Arts Space, Minneapolis, Minnesota 
 Davis Photo Expo 1993, Davis Art Center, Davis, California 
 Memorial Union Art Gallery, Davis, California 

1993 
 Photography Gallery, Tisch School of the Arts, New York University, NYC 
 1301 Pound Woman, Pence Gallery, Davis, California

1992
 Progetto Cuspide 1992, Associazione Promozione Iniziative Socioculturli, Pirri, Sardegna, Italy

1991
 A Time to Sing, The Ellis Gallery, Pittsburgh, Pennsylvania
 Forbes Gallery, Pittsburgh, Pennsylvania

1990
 Forbes Gallery, Pittsburgh, Pennsylvania

Awards
 2004  Fleishhacker Foundation Eureka Fellowship
 2001–02 Affiliate Artists, Headlands Center for the Arts
 2000 Artists in Residence, Headlands Center for the Arts
 1999 Art Council Grant
 1998 Bay Guardian Goldie Award, San Francisco, California
 1997 Bay Area Awards Show, New Langton Arts, San Francisco, California
 1995 Artists in Residence, Villa Montavlo, Saratoga, California
 1994 Artists in Residence, Southern Exposure, San Francisco, California
 1993 National Graduate Fellows, American Photography Institute, New York University, New York, New York
 1992 Artists in Residence, Associazione Promozione Iniziative Socioculturli, Pirri, Sardegna, Italy

Collections
 San Francisco Museum of Modern Art, San Francisco, California

Teaching
 2007–present University of California, Berkeley, assistant professor of sculpture (Reiman)
 2001–present San Francisco Art Institute, visiting artist (Castaneda) 
 2001–07 California College of Arts and Crafts, adjunct professors
 2000 University of California, Berkeley, visiting lecturers
 1999 Carnegie Mellon University, visiting artists

References 

American artist groups and collectives
1970 births
Living people
Artists from the San Francisco Bay Area
American contemporary artists
American women artists
21st-century American women